The South African 2nd Infantry Division was an infantry division of the army of the Union of South Africa during World War II.  The division was formed on 23 October 1940 and served in the Western Desert Campaign and was captured (save for one brigade) by German and Italian forces at Tobruk on 21 June 1942.  The remaining brigade was re-allocated to the South African 1st Infantry Division.

History
The division was formed on 23 October 1940 with its divisional HQ at Voortrekkerhoogte, South Africa. On 21 June 1942 two complete infantry brigades of the division as well as most of the supporting units were captured at the fall of Tobruk.

Bardia and the Western Desert
The division capture of Bardia was part of the Libyan campaign against Rommel's Afrika Korps from November 1941 to January 1942. They defeated a numerically superior Axis force in a strongly fortified position with a combined infantry and tank force.

Order of battle 
21 September 1941
 3 S. A. Inf Bde. -
 Comd. Brig. C. E. BORAIN 
 Tps.
 1 I.L.H.
 1 R.L.I
 1 KAFF R. (under comd from 1000 hrs 25 Dec. 41)
 B & C Coys D. M. R.
 2 S. A. Fd Coy less one sec.
 One Sec 10 S. A. Fd Coy.
 One Pl 4 Bde Sig Coy. Under comd from 1000 hrs 26 Dec.
 5 Bde Sig Coy less one pl.
 3 S. A. Bde 'Q' Services Coy.
 Three dets 14 S. A. Fd Amb. (Under comd from D.-1)
 with in support:
 One Regt 1 Army Tank Bde.
 Arty as arranged by C. R. A.
 Task.
 To attack BARDIA through perimeter defences as described in Para 6 (a) and in Operation Instruction No. 21 (Appx 'A').
 NORTHFORCE
 Comd. Lt. Col. J. BUTLER-PORTER  1 R.D.L.I.
 Tps.
 1 R.D.L.I.
 Sec 2 S. A. Fd Coy.
 Pl 5 Bde Sig. Coy.
 Det 16 Fd Amb. Under comd from 1000 hrs 26 Dec.
 with in support:
 N. Z. Div Cav Regt, less one sqn.
 Tasks.
 To contain and demonstrate against enemy forces within the perimeter along the gen line of enemy defences from incl 51143960—incl 51554030, in accordance with Operation Instruction No. 22 (Appx 'C'). [5]
 KINGFORCE
 Comd. Lt. Col. W. KINGWELL  D. M. R.
 Tps.
 D.M.R. less B. C. & D. Coys and one pl A. Coy.
 Two Pls 7 S. A. Armd Recce Bn.
 Det 4 S. A. Fd Coy (Under comd from 1000 hrs 26 Dec.).
 with in support:
 One Sqn N. Z. Div Car Regt.
 Task.
 To contain and demonstrate against enemy forces along the gen line of the perimeter defences from incl 51973860—excl 51143960, in accordance with Operation Instruction No. 23 (Appx 'D'). [5]
 SOUTHFORCE
 Comd. Maj. P. J. JACOBS, 7 S. A. Armd Recce Bn.
 Tps.
 7 S. A. Armd Recce Bn, less one Coy and two pls.
 Det 4 S. A. Fd Coy
 Det 14 S. A. Fd Amb. (Under comd from 1000 hrs 26 Dec.)
Task.
 To contain and demonstrate against enemy forces along the gen line of perimeter defences from incl MARSA ER RAMLA 52423868—excl 51973860, in accordance with Operation Instruction No. 24 (Appx. 'E'). [5]
 RESERVES
 Comd. Lt. Col. R. J. PALMER, 1 S. A. P.
 Tps.
 One Regt 1 Army Tank Bde.
 1 S.A.P.
 Sec 4 S. A. Fd Coy.
 Det 14 S. A. Fd. Amb.

"Fortress Tobruk"

Surrender

After the capture of the rest of the division, 3rd South African Infantry Brigade and the 1st Field Regiment of the Cape Field Artillery became part of the South African 1st Infantry Division.

Order of battle

Initial operational deployment: 2 December 1941
On 18 September 1941 the division was re-allocated from X Corps command to falling under General HQ command and were responsible for protecting the railway and water supply lines between Alexandria and Mersa Matruh.  On 11 October, the Kaffrarian Rifles were detached from the division and deployed to protect the landing fields in the Daba-Fuka-Bagush area.  On taking over responsibility for the Frontier area on 2 December 1941 the divisional order of battle, as part of the 8th Army was:

 HQ 2nd Infantry Division (Maj-Gen I.P. de Villiers)
 One Squadron 6th South African Armoured Car Regiment
 Braforce (Brig. Medley)
 2nd South African Infantry Brigade (Brig. W.H.E. Poole)
 4th South African Infantry Brigade (less one battalion) (Brig. A.A. Hayton)
 4th Field Regiment, S A Artillery
 One Battery, 5th Field Regiment, S A Artillery
 One Troop, 67th Medium Regiment, Royal Artillery
 One Troop, 68th Medium Regiment, Royal Artillery
 C and D Companies, Die Middelandse Regiment
 3rd South African Infantry Brigade (Brig C.E. Borain, MC, VD):
 Imperial Light Horse
 1st Royal Durban Light Infantry
 Rand Light Infantry
 5th Field Regiment, S A Artillery (less one battery)
 6th South African Infantry Brigade (Brig. F.W. Cooper):
 2nd Transvaal Scottish
 1st South African Police Battalion
 2nd South African Police Battalion
 1st Field Regiment, Cape Field Artillery
 Railhead Force (Lt. Col. G.E.L. L'Estrange VD):
 Umvoti Mounted Rifles
 Die Middellandse Regiment
 Detachment TDS (approx 30 "I" Tanks)
 10th Field Company, South African Engineering Corps
 5th New Zealand Infantry Brigade Group

Order of battle: The Fall of Tobruk 
Order of Battle as at 20 June 1942

 Division troops
 Die Middelandse Regiment (Machine-gun battalion)
 7th South African Reconnaissance Battalion
 2nd Field Regiment, Natal Field Artillery, South African Artillery
 3rd Field Regiment, Transvaal Horse Artillery, South African Artillery
 6th Anti-Tank Battery, South African Artillery
 2nd Light Anti-aircraft Regiment, South African Artillery
 2nd Battery, Cape Field Artillery Composed of men from Umtata, Transkei
 4th & 10th South African Field Companies, S A Engineers
 4th South African Infantry Brigade
 2nd Royal Durban Light Infantry
 Umvoti Mounted Rifles
 The Kaffrarian Rifles
 Blake Group (a composite battalion ex 1 SA Div)
 6th South African Infantry Brigade
 1st S.A. Police Battalion
 2nd S.A. Police Battalion
 2nd Transvaal Scottish Regiment

Theatres of operation
The theatres that the division served in were as follows:

 South Africa: 23 October 1940 to 20 April 1941
 At Sea: 20 April 1941 to 6 June 1941
 Egypt: 6 June 1941 to 22 March 1942
 Libya: 22 March 1942 to 21 June 1942

Battles, actions and engagements
The division took part in the following battles, actions and engagements:
Bardia: 31 December 1941 to 2 January 1942. Some 8,000 Allied prisoners of war were freed and some 6,000 Axis prisoners were taken.
 Clayden's Trench (Sollum): 11 January 1942 to 12 January 1942
 Gazala: 26 May 1942 to 21 June 1942
 Tobruk: 20 June 1942 to 21 June 1942.  The number of South African prisoners taken at Tobruk has been recorded as 10,772

Notes

Citations

Bibliography

External links

 

South African World War II divisions
Infantry divisions of South Africa
Military units and formations established in 1940
Military history of South Africa
Military units and formations of South Africa in World War II
Military units and formations of the British Empire in World War II
Military units and formations disestablished in 1942